Bernard Markham was an Anglican bishop in the 20th century.

Born on 26 February 1905 and educated at Bingley Grammar School and  Leeds University, he was ordained in 1931. After curacies at Lidget Green  and  Stoke-on-Trent he held incumbencies at  Bierley, North Kensington, Ardwick and St Margaret's, Toxteth, Liverpool (where he was Vicar from 1 September 1959 to July 1962). In 1962 he was appointed  Bishop of Nassau, resigning a decade later. He was then an Assistant Bishop within the Anglican Diocese of Southwell until his death on  21 June 1984.

Notes

External links
The People's Order of the Mass and Other Prayers (1965) issued by Bernard Markham

1905 births
People educated at Bingley Grammar School
Alumni of the University of Leeds
20th-century Anglican bishops in the Caribbean
Anglican bishops of Nassau
1984 deaths